A number of steamships have been named SS Britannia:

 , wrecked in 1873.
 , built for the United Kingdom Steamship Company at Short Brothers of Sunderland, scuttled as a blockship at Scapa Flow in 1914.
 , scrapped in 1909.
 , operating in Howe Sound, British Columbia, withdrawn from service in 1928.
 , scrapped in 1949.
 , sunk by the German auxiliary cruiser Thor in 1941.
 , scrapped in 2008.

See also
 
 
 
 
 

Ship names